Zink can refer to:

Zink (printing), an inkless printing technology used in instant photo printers
Zink, another name for the cornett or cornetto, a Renaissance wind instrument
Zink (Faroese band), a former Faroese punk band
Zink, an album by Dutch musician Bloem de Ligny
 Zink Cars, a former constructor of Formula Vee and other racing cars founded by Ed Zink

People:
Charlie Zink (born 1979), American baseball player
Nell Zink (born 1964), American novelist
Nicolaus Zink (1812–1887), founder of Sisterdale, Texas

See also 
 Zinc (disambiguation)
Zinke, a surname